

First round selections

The following are the first round picks in the 1972 Major League Baseball draft.

* Did not sign

Other notable selections

* Did not sign

Background 
The Montreal Expos had perhaps their best draft in franchise history. The Expos grabbed outfielder Ellis Valentine in round two of the June regular phase and then selected catcher Gary Carter one round later. The Pirates also did well, selecting pitcher John Candelaria in round two and second baseman Willie Randolph in round seven.

Some of the significant picks from the regular phase in June included Dennis Eckersley and Rick Manning (Cleveland). Scott McGregor (New York Yankees) in round one. Also selected in the first round were Chet Lemon (Oakland), Larry Christenson (Philadelphia) and the number one pick, Dave Roberts (San Diego). Roberts went directly to the Padres starting third base position from the University of Oregon campus. The biggest steal was pulled off by the Texas Rangers when they selected infielder Mike Hargrove from Northwestern State University in the 25th round.

Jerry Manuel and Mike Ondina became the first pair of high school teammates to be drafted in the first round of a Major League draft. Both attended Cordova High School in Rancho Cordova, California.

Notes

External links 
Complete draft list from The Baseball Cube database

References 

Draft
Major League Baseball draft